Shaquille O'Neal Presents His Superfriends, Vol. 1 is an unreleased album by Shaquille O'Neal. Completed in 2001, it was intended to be the NBA superstar's fifth solo album. Producers for the album included Denaun Porter, Big Tank, L. T. Hutton, Rick Rock, and Dr. Dre. The original release date was slated for September 11, 2001, but was pushed back to October 9 of the same year. After much delay, the album was completely abandoned and never released.

Background
O'Neal had released four albums before Superfriends: 1993's platinum-certified Shaq Diesel; 1994's platinum-certified Shaq-Fu: Da Return; 1996's gold-certified Can't Stop the Reign; and 1998's Respect.  O'Neal also released a "Best Of" album that debuted in 1996.

O'Neal originally began the "Superfriends" project telling The Source Magazine that the album was going to be "revolutionary" and that he wanted to "bring together all genres."  In 2000, he told the New York Times that he was working on negotiations with Pink, Limp Bizkit, Dr. Dre, and George Clinton.  Although Shaq did not land all of the performers he had in mind, he still managed to gather a notable cast of "Superfriends."

In 2001, Shaquille O'Neal performed a rendition of Rob Base and DJ E-Z Rock's platinum 1988 hit "It Takes Two" at the Los Angeles Lakers back-to-back championship victory parade in front of the Los Angeles Staples Center. It was later stated in an interview that O'Neal had already begun production for the track after the Lakers first championship win in 2000.  The song was scheduled to a part of his "Superfriends" compilation and featured vocalist Nicole Scherzinger (formerly from Eden's Crush and now of The Pussycat Dolls).

Contributors
As the title suggests, the album was to host many of Shaq's musical associates.  Scheduled to appear on the album were Nate Dogg, R.L. of Next, Peter Gunz, Fieldy of Korn, Thor-El, Dr. Dre, Shawn Stockman of Boyz II Men, Lord Tariq, 112, Jayo Felony, WC of Westside Connection, Trina, Ludacris, Joi of Lucy Pearl, Black Star, Nicole Scherzinger, Common, Black Thought of The Roots, Nick Hexum and Chad Sexton of 311, Black Rob, Twista, George Clinton, Memphis Bleek, Snoop Dogg, and Angie Stone.

Singles
Because the project was abandoned, the only available music from album was released in singles by Fireworks Productions.  Most of the singles that were released were only given to "Shaq Team" members, a group of the American public that volunteered to promote and distribute the material.  Singles were released on both 12" vinyl and compact discs.

The first single off the "Superfriends" album, "Connected," was a West coast success. The song received large radio play from California hip-hop stations such as Power 106, KDAY, and 100.3 The Beat. The following singles "Do It Faster" and "In the Sun" were not as well received.

Reception

"Music may be Shaq's hobby, but he doesn't mess around. Shaquille O'Neal Presents His Superfriends, Vol. 1 likely won't appeal to any new fans.  But those who have been along for the ride will be rewarded with this album."

 — J.T. Griffith, Allmusic

Track listing

Cut tracks
 "You'd Be Lyin'" (featuring Peter Gunz)
 "I Don't Give a Fuck" (featuring The Lady of Rage)
 "4 Commandments" (featuring Sixx John)
 "It Takes Two" (featuring Nicole Scherzinger)

References

Albums produced by Dr. Dre
Albums produced by Rick Rock
Shaquille O'Neal albums
Unreleased albums
Trauma Records albums
Albums produced by L.T. Hutton